Brownfield is a hamlet in central Alberta, Canada within the County of Paintearth No. 18. It is only a few miles south from the Battle River and positioned along Highway 872.

Named in 1907 after Charles D. Brownfield, the first postmaster of the local Post Office.

Demographics 
Brownfield recorded a population of 27 in the 1991 Census of Population conducted by Statistics Canada.

Education 
Brownfield is home to the Brownfield Community School, which is a part of Clearview School Division No. 71. The Brownfield Community School includes programs from Pre-School to Grade Nine. Following Grade Nine students are bused to Coronation, Alberta for high school.

The building is also home to the Brownfield Public Library, which is a member of the Parkland Regional Library System.

Recreation 
Located in Brownfield is the Brownfield Recreation Centre. It includes a two sheet curling rink, concession area, bar, floor curling/dance floor, and stage with sound system. The property also has a small outdoor skating rink and skate shack. It provides a venue for events like curling bonspiels, weddings, community meals (e.g. the annual turkey supper), wedding showers, funerals, and family reunions.

The Brownfield Community School has a small gymnasium. It is used for the local Junior High sports teams, the Brownfield Bobcats (basketball, volleyball, etc.); youth group nights; school concerts; and fitness groups. On the school grounds there are two playground sets, swings, a sand volleyball court, cement basketball court, rough soccer field, and two baseball backstops.

A few miles North in the Battle River Valley lies the County of Paintearth run Burma Park. It has three baseball diamonds, including two with shale and dugouts. Burma Park is a campground and offers a number of RV and Tenting sites.

The surrounding area of Brownfield, especially the Battle River Valley, teems with wildlife and is a great place to go hunting, in the various hunting seasons. There are two nearby hunting lodges: Battle River Lodge and King West Outfitters.

Climate

See also 
List of communities in Alberta
List of hamlets in Alberta

References 

Hamlets in Alberta
County of Paintearth No. 18